The Net 25 tower is a free-standing lattice tower with triangular cross section used by Net 25 a Philippine television network based out of Quezon City.
It is currently the second tallest structure in the Philippines and one of the tallest lattice towers in the world. Its transmitter transmits the signals of Net 25 (DZEC-TV) & Eagle FM 95.5 (DWDM-FM).

See also 
 Lattice tower
 List of tallest freestanding steel structures

References

External links
http://www.eaglebroadcasting.net/dzec/

Lattice towers
Towers completed in 2000
Broadcast transmitters
Buildings and structures in Quezon City
Transmitter sites in the Philippines